"Comin' Down" is a song by Australian hard rock band The Angels, released in March 1978 as the lead single from the band's second studio album, Face to Face.  The song first peaked at number 80 on the Australian Kent Music Report. It was co-written by band members, Doc Neeson, John Brewster and Rick Brewster.

Track listing

Personnel 
 Doc Neeson – lead vocals
 Richard Brewster – lead guitar
 John Brewster – rhythm guitar
 Chris Bailey – bass guitar
 Graham "Buzz" Bidstrup – drums
production team 
 Engineer – Mark Opitz
 Producer – Vanda & Young

Charts

References

The Angels (Australian band) songs
1978 songs
1978 singles
Song recordings produced by Harry Vanda
Song recordings produced by George Young (rock musician)
Songs written by Doc Neeson
Songs written by John Brewster (musician)
Albert Productions singles